The Makhaleng River is a river of western Lesotho. It rises in the Maluti Mountains, flows generally in a southwesterly direction to join the Orange River at the border with Free State in South Africa.

Course
It flows southwest across the Lesotho Highlands past the towns and villages of Molimo-Nthuse, Makhaleng, Ramabanta and Qaba, flowing into the Orange River at the international border by the Free State near the Makhaleng Bridge.

The valley of the river forms part of the approach to several mountain passes, notably the God Help Me Pass and the Gates of Paradise Pass. The Qiloane Falls are a tourist attraction located in the upper course of the river.

In Lesotho this river in its upper parts does not have a flood plain. The flow is swift and the river rises rapidly after heavy rainfall in the mountains and during the spring thaw. There are no large reservoirs on the river, but there are a number of small and medium-sized ones constructed for soil conservation and for water collection purposes. These are liable to silt up and a few have washed away.

Tributaries
The Makhaleng has three main tributaries the Makhalaneng, the Qhoqhoane and the Khibiting. All of them flow into it from the right bank as they drain the water off the Maluti Mountains.

References

 
Rivers of Lesotho
Tributaries of the Orange River
Lesotho–South Africa border
International rivers of Africa